Mechanitis lysimnia, the confused tigerwing, sweet-oil tiger or lysimnia tigerwing, is a species of butterfly of the family Nymphalidae. It was described by Johan Christian Fabricius in 1793. It is found in Central and South America, from southern Mexico to Uruguay.

Adults have been recorded feeding on nectar from Eupatorium flowers.

The larvae are gregarious and feed on Solanum species and possibly other members of the family Solanaceae. They are pale green streaked with yellow.

Subspecies
M. l. lysimnia (Brazil, Uruguay)
M. l. bipuncta Forbes, 1948 (Venezuela)
M. l. elisa (Guérin-Méneville, [1844]) (Ecuador, Peru, Bolivia, Brazil: Mato Grosso)
M. l. labotas Distant, 1876 (Costa Rica)
M. l. limnaea Forbes, 1930 (French Guiana)
M. l. macrinus Hewitson, 1860 (Panama, Colombia, Ecuador)
M. l. menecles Hewitson, 1860 (Brazil: Amazonas, Acre)
M. l. nesaea Hübner, [1820] (Brazil: Bahia)
M. l. ocona Druce, 1876 (Peru)
M. l. roqueensis Bryk, 1953 (Peru)
M. l. solaria Forbes, 1948 (Venezuela)
M. l. utemaia Reakirt, 1866 (Honduras, Mexico)
M. l. tapajona Freitas & Pona, 2022 (Brasil)

References

External links
 

Butterflies described in 1793
Ithomiini
Fauna of Brazil
Nymphalidae of South America
Taxa named by Johan Christian Fabricius